Lawrence S. Ting Charity Walk is a charity walk event to raise fund for the poor and needy people in Ho Chi Minh City, Vietnam.

History
Lawrence Ting Charity Walk was first set up in 2006 in memory of Lawrence Ting, the founder of Phu My Hung Corporation.  It has since become of one of the largest charity walks in Vietnam. Lawrence Ting Charity Walk is held in the Phu My Hung New City Center in District 7 (Q7), of Ho Chi Minh City. The walking course is approximately 4 km.

All funds raised from the event are donated to the Funds for the Poor for the nearby districts and other charity funds.

Over 12,000 people participated in the walk in 2008. 
Over 15,000 people participated in 2009.

Many Vietnamese and foreign corporations participate and raise funds for this event. Corporations such as Tan Thuan Corporation, Hiep Phuoc Power Company, Pepsi Vietnam, Sino-Pacific Construction Consultancy, CX Technology, AA Corporation, Mei Linh Taxi, Phu Hung Securities, Fubon Insurance and many others all have participated in this event.

From 2006 to 2011, Lawrence S. Ting Charity Walk has raised over VND 6 billion, approximately US$300,000, for the poor.

References

Entertainment events in Vietnam
Challenge walks